Arthur Fredrick Cook (1889 – 1930) was an English footballer who played as a defender in the Football League for Swansea Town and West Bromwich Albion. Cook guested for Stoke in 1918–19, making five appearances.

Career statistics
Source:

References

1889 births
1930 deaths
Sportspeople from Stafford
Association football defenders
English footballers
Stafford Rangers F.C. players
Wrexham A.F.C. players
West Bromwich Albion F.C. players
Luton Town F.C. players
Swansea City A.F.C. players
Whitchurch F.C. players
English Football League players
Stoke City F.C. wartime guest players
FA Cup Final players